Gottlieb Fröhlich (born 13 August 1948) is a Swiss rower who competed in the 1968 Summer Olympics.

He was born in Wohlen bei Bern.

In 1968 he was the coxswain of the Swiss boat which won the bronze medal in the coxed fours competition.

External links
 

1948 births
Living people
Swiss male rowers
Coxswains (rowing)
Olympic rowers of Switzerland
Rowers at the 1968 Summer Olympics
Olympic bronze medalists for Switzerland
Olympic medalists in rowing
Medalists at the 1968 Summer Olympics
20th-century Swiss people